Plug-in, plug in or plugin may refer to:
 Plug-in (computing) is a software component that adds a specific feature to an existing computer program.
 Audio plug-in, adds audio signal processing features
 Photoshop plugin, a piece of software that enhances the functionality of Adobe Photoshop
 Plug-in electric vehicle, type of electric vehicle
Plug-in hybrid, a type of plug-in electric vehicle
Glade PlugIns, fragrance distribution product
Plug Ins, chain of electronics stores owned by Al-Futtaim Group

People with the surname
 Vladimir Plugin (1937–2003), Russian historian and art historian

See also
 AC power plugs and sockets, two- or three-pronged wall electrical outlets
 Add-on (disambiguation)
 Browser extension, which modifies the interface and/or behaviour of web browsers
 Change of variables, a mathematical procedure wherein substitutions are made in a formula
 Plug and play, a common standard for hardware equipment installation